Michelle Buckingham (born 1 September 1968 in Los Angeles) is a Canadian former judoka who competed in the 1992 Summer Olympics, in the 1996 Summer Olympics, and in the 2000 Summer Olympics.

References

See also
Judo in Ontario
Judo in Canada
List of Canadian judoka

1968 births
Living people
Sportspeople from Los Angeles
Canadian female judoka
Olympic judoka of Canada
Judoka at the 1992 Summer Olympics
Judoka at the 1996 Summer Olympics
Judoka at the 2000 Summer Olympics
Pan American Games medalists in judo
Pan American Games silver medalists for Canada
Judoka at the 1995 Pan American Games
Medalists at the 1995 Pan American Games
20th-century Canadian women